Paul Freeman Fearon (July 4, 1904 – December 30, 1991) was a Canadian politician. He served in the Legislative Assembly of New Brunswick as member of the Progressive Conservative party from 1952 to 1960.

References

1904 births
1991 deaths
Progressive Conservative Party of New Brunswick MLAs